Chopi may refer to:
 Chopi people, an ethnic group of Mozambique
 Chopi language, a Bantu language spoken along the southern coast of Mozambique
 Chopi blackbird (Gnorimopsar chopi), a bird of family Icteridae
 A spice made from Zanthoxylum piperitum, an aromatic plant in the family Rutaceae